Hot Properties may refer to:

Hot Properties (TV series), a 2005 American sitcom
Hot Properties (talk show), a 1985 talk show hosted by comic Richard Belzer